Omnisphere is an album by avant-jazz-funk organ trio Medeski, Martin & Wood and the "new music collective" Alarm Will Sound orchestra recorded live at the Newman Center for the Performing Arts in Denver CO.

Reception
In his review for DownBeat, Michael Jackson stated, "Medeski Martin & Wood’s new album offers a summation of the group’s purpose three decades into its unconventional career. Omnisphere (Indirecto), recorded in 2015 with new-music ensemble Alarm Will Sound, provides evidence of the trio’s boundless creativity." Philip Boot of JazzTimes stated, "on the provocative Omnisphere, recorded live in 2015, Medeski Martin & Wood venture into contemporary classical music, with the help of 20-piece chamber orchestra Alarm Will Sound." Spectrum Culture'''s Will Layman commented, "With Omnisphere, MMW proves again that they are committed to surprises despite their popularity. Collaborating with Alarm Will Sound, a small orchestra from the “new music” side of the classical world, they have created yet another kind of hybrid creativity." Bill Milkowski of The Absolute Sound'' commented, "...the direct hits far outweigh the misses throughout this intriguing double vinyl album."

Track listing
 Kid Tao Mammal (unworldliness weirdo)
 Anonymous Skulls
 Coral Sea
 oh ye of little faith… (do you know where your children are?)
 Northern Lights
 Eye of Ra
 End of the World Party

Performers
John Medeski, piano and keyboards
Billy Martin, percussion
Chris Wood, bass
 Erin Lesser, flutes
 Christa Robinson, oboe
 Hideaki Aomori, clarinet
 Elisabeth Stimpert, bass clarinets
 Michael Harley, bassoon
 Matt Marks, horn
 Jason Price, trumpet
 Michael Clayville, trombone
 John Orfe, piano
 Chris Thompson, percussion
 Matt Smallcomb, percussion
 Courtney Orlando, violin
 Caleb Burhans, violin
 Isabel Hagen, viola
 Stefan Freund, cello
 Miles Brown, bass
 Alan Pierson, conductor and Artistic Director

References

2018 albums
Medeski Martin & Wood albums